The 1968–69 Bulgarian Cup was the 29th season of the Bulgarian Cup (in this period the tournament was named Cup of the Soviet Army). CSKA Sofia won the competition, beating Levski Sofia 2–1 in the final at the Vasil Levski National Stadium.

First round

|}

Group stage

Group 1
Matches were played in Pazardzhik and Velingrad

|}

Group 2
Matches were played in Blagoevgrad, Dupnitsa and Sofia

|}

Group 3
Matches were played in Sliven, Stara Zagora and Nova Zagora

|}

Group 4
Matches were played in Haskovo, Dimitrovgrad and Harmanli

|}

Semi-finals

Final

Details

References

1968-69
1968–69 domestic association football cups
Cup